{{Infobox person
|name=Teo Gebert
|image=PlaySchoolRockyTeo.jpg
|caption=Teo Gebert, 2015
|birth_date=
|occupation=actor
|known_for=Appearing in numerous Australian television programs and films
|notable_works={{hlist|Fatal Bond|Sniper: Reloaded|The Boys, Crooked Business}}
|television=
}}
Teo Gebert (born 2 September 1974) is an Australian actor who has appeared in numerous film, television and theatre roles, best known as a regular presenter of Play School.

 Personal life 
Gebert comes from a theatrical background. , "... my father is a musician, my mother an actor, my uncle an actor, my grandfather ran theatres and my grandmother had dreams of being a ballerina when she was a little girl." His mother Helen Livermore is Reg Livermore's sister and his father, Bobby is a jazz musician.

Theatre
Gebert made his stage debut in Reg Livermore's musical Big Sister in 1990  Further performances as listed on AusStage 
 Big Sister - A Larrikin Opera, Riverside Theatres, Parramatta, NSW, 29 April 1990
 The Trackers of Oxyrhynchus, The Wharf Theatre, Walsh Bay, NSW, 21 January 1992
 The Heartbreak Kid, Ensemble Theatre, Kirribilli, NSW, 3 May 1993
 Mixed Emotions, Ensemble Theatre, Kirribilli, NSW, 7 July 1994
 Waiting Rooms, Ensemble Theatre, Kirribilli, NSW, 1 September 1994
 The Quartet from Rigoletto, Q Theatre, Penrith, NSW, 17 March 1995
 The Quartet from Rigoletto, Ensemble Theatre, Kirribilli, NSW, 20 April 1995
 Blackrock, Wharf 1, Sydney, NSW, 30 August 1995
 The Life of Galileo, Drama Theatre (Sydney Opera House) 1 June 1996
 Men of Honour, Ensemble Theatre, Kirribilli, NSW, 5 April 2001
 Lawrence & Holloman, Darlinghurst Theatre, Darlinghurst, NSW, 2 February 2005
 Absurd Person Singular, Ensemble Theatre, Kirribilli, NSW, 26 October 2009

Film
Gebert made his film debut in Fatal Bond alongside Linda Blair and has appeared in Sniper: Reloaded with Billy Zane and Tom Berenger. He next had lead roles in the indie films Square One and The Venus Factory and support in The Boys. In 1998 he started his close association with director Paul Middleditch playing a demented Nazi in Terra Nova and in 2001 they wrote and collaborated on the art-house film A Cold Summer. Gebert has also appeared in Under the Radar, Safety in Numbers and starred as Elmo in the gangster comedy Crooked Business. He plays a demented prison guard in the 2017 film Emporium.

Television
Gebert played numerous television roles in Family and Friends, GP, The Feds, Murder Call, Wildside, Stingers, Above the Law, Farscape, Love Bytes, Two Twisted, and The Cut. Gebert played Laurie Pendergast in Underbelly: A Tale of Two Cities and Dr Lovallo on Home and Away. Gebert has been a regular presenter on Play School since 2004 and in 2012 did a spin-off show called Little Ted's Big Adventures. He's appeared in the web series Avalon Now and  Avalon Now 2''.

References

External links

Australian male actors
1974 births
Living people
Place of birth missing (living people)
Australian children's television presenters